Many Glacier Hotel is a historic hotel located on the east shore of Swiftcurrent Lake in Glacier National Park in the U.S. state of Montana. The building is designed as a series of chalets, up to four stories tall, and stretches for a substantial distance along the lakeshore. The building has a Swiss alpine theme both on the outside and on the inside.  The foundation is made of stone, with a wood superstructure. The outside is finished with brown-painted wood siding, and the window framing and balconies have wood sawed in Swiss jigsawed patterns. On the inside, the four-story lobby is surrounded by balconies, whose railings are patterned after Swiss designs.

Construction began at Many Glacier Hotel in 1914 and was finished in just 1 year on July 4, 1915. The Great Northern Railway was establishing a series of hotels and backcountry chalets in the park and the Many Glacier Hotel was the "Gem of the West".  This was part of an effort by Louis W. Hill, president of the Great Northern Railway and son of James J. Hill, to establish Glacier National Park as a destination resort and to promote the area as the "American Alps".  To this end, Hill chose a Swiss chalet style for the hotels and chalets.  The Glacier Park Lodge (previously known as the Glacier Park Hotel) and the Many Glacier Hotel were intended to be the core structures, while the chalets and campgrounds were sited in the backcountry within an easy day's ride or hike from one of the hotels or another chalet.  The chalets were intended to entice visitors to leave the hotels and see the backcountry in a more rustic manner. These chalets were especially used during the early 1900s when the Hotel first opened, and the main attraction in the park was horseback riding.

Current status
Today, the hotel still maintains its historic character. Most rooms either have views of Swiftcurrent Lake or the surrounding mountain scenery.  The hotel is a contributing property in the National Historic Landmark, Great Northern Railway Buildings district. Many Glacier Hotel is a member of Historic Hotels of America, the official program of the National Trust for Historic Preservation.

History
This hotel was first built in 1914 near Glacier National Park. It was closed due to COVID-19 in 2020. It opened again on June 4, 2021. This hotel includes 2 suites, 7 family rooms and 205 guest rooms offering lakeside, deluxe, standard and value lodging options. All of the rooms have private bathrooms, telephones, king and queen beds or standard double or twin beds. Guest and hotel facilities are all non-smoking.

See also

 List of Historic Hotels of America
 Lake McDonald Lodge at West Glacier, Montana within Glacier National Park
 Prince of Wales Hotel within Waterton Lakes National Park

Notes

References

 
 
 

National Historic Landmarks in Montana
Hotel buildings on the National Register of Historic Places in Montana
Great Northern Railway (U.S.) hotels
Hotel buildings completed in 1914
Rustic architecture in Montana
Tourist attractions in Glacier County, Montana
1914 establishments in Montana
Historic district contributing properties in Montana
National Register of Historic Places in Glacier County, Montana
National Register of Historic Places in Glacier National Park
Swiss Chalet Revival architecture
Historic Hotels of America